Catherine Wheel were an English alternative rock band from Great Yarmouth and Lowestoft. The band was active from 1990 to 2000, releasing five full-length albums in their career, embarking on many lengthy tours and experiencing fluctuating levels of commercial success. Initially receiving attention and success after releasing their debut album Ferment in 1992, the band achieved peak success with the release of "Crank" and their album Chrome in 1993. The band also achieved minor success with other albums, including Happy Days, which featured a popular song "Judy Staring at the Sun" as a collaboration with Tanya Donelly. Catherine Wheel also scored heavy rotation on MTV and performed there several times. Despite never having any albums or songs that achieved major success in their homeland, Catherine Wheel continue to be popular among alternative rock and shoegaze fans and critics.

History
Catherine Wheel formed in 1990, comprising singer-guitarist Rob Dickinson (cousin of Iron Maiden's Bruce Dickinson), guitarist Brian Futter, bassist Dave Hawes, and drummer Neil Sims. Hawes had previously played in a Joy Division-influenced band called Eternal. They took their moniker from the firework known as the Catherine wheel, which in turn had taken its name from the medieval torture device of the same name. The band was sometimes included in the shoegazing scene, characterized by bands that made extensive use of guitar feedback and droning washes of noise, as well as their continuous interaction with extensive numbers of effects pedals on the stage floor.

The band performed a Peel session in early 1991 while still unsigned; two 12" vinyl EPs were released on the Norwich-based Wilde Club Records, named after the regular weekly Wilde Club gigs run by Barry Newman at Norwich Arts Centre. They signed to major-label Fontana Records after being courted by both Creation Records and the Brian Eno-run label Opal Records. The band's debut album, 1991/92's Ferment, made an immediate impression on the music press and introduced Catherine Wheel's second-biggest U.S. hit, "Black Metallic", as well as the moderate hit "I Want to Touch You". The album features re-recorded versions of some of the Wilde Club-issued EPs. "Black Metallic" was later featured in the film S. Darko.

The more aggressive Chrome followed in 1993, produced by Gil Norton. With this album, the band began to shed its original shoegazing tag, while still making skillful use of atmospherics, such as on the song "Fripp". In a 2007 interview, Rob Dickinson said that members of Death Cab for Cutie and Interpol told him that without this album, their bands "wouldn't exist."

1995's Happy Days saw the band delving further into metallic hard rock, which alienated a portion of their fanbase, even as it increased their exposure in the United States during the post-grunge era. The single "Waydown", and especially its plane-crash themed video, received heavy play in the U.S. A more sedate strain of rock known as Britpop was taking over in the UK, causing Catherine Wheel to continue to have greater success abroad than at home.

The B-sides and outtakes collection, Like Cats and Dogs, came out the following year, revealing a quieter, more contemplative side of the band, spanning the previous five years. This carried over into Adam and Eve in 1997, wherein the band scaled back the sonic force of their sound from its Happy Days levels, with clean playing on some songs that featured extensive use of keyboards and acoustic guitars. Alternately, songs like "Satellite" and "Here Comes the Fat Controller" were lush and orchestral in scope.

In 2000, Catherine Wheel re-emerged with a new record label, a new bassist (Ben Ellis); a modified name (The Catherine Wheel); and a new album, Wishville. After mixed reviews, record company turmoil and lacklustre sales, the band went on a hiatus. In January 2022, the band began updating a new Instagram account, suggesting that the band had reformed in some capacity.

In March 2010, Ferment was re-released, containing bonus tracks and extensive sleeve notes.

Post-Catherine Wheel work
Futter and Sims have an ongoing project called 50 ft Monster. Ellis was in a band called Serafin, and went on to play with Iggy Pop. After working with/ playing live with Tracy Bonham for several years, Dickinson released a solo album in 2005 called Fresh Wine for the Horses. Dickinson retired from recording and founded a Porsche restoration company called Singer Vehicle Design in 2009.

Band members 
 Final line-up
 Rob Dickinson – lead vocals, guitars (1990–2000)
 Brian Futter – guitars, backing vocals (1990–2000)
 Ben Ellis – bass guitar (1999–2000)
 Neil Sims – drums, percussion, backing vocals (1990–2000)

 Past members
 Dave Hawes – bass guitar (1990–1999)

Discography

Studio albums
Ferment (1992) – No. 36 UK
Chrome (1993) – No. 58 UK
Happy Days (1995) – No. 163 US
Adam and Eve (1997) – No. 53 UK, No. 178 US
Wishville (2000)

EPs
 She's My Friend (1991)
 Painful Thing (1991) – No. 5 U.K. Indie Chart

Compilation albums
Like Cats and Dogs (1996) – No. 36 Heatseekers (U.S.)

Singles

References

External links
/broken link Official Rob Dickinson Website
/broken link Lewis Slade's comprehensive fan site

Musical groups established in 1990
Musical groups disestablished in 2000
English alternative rock groups
British shoegaze musical groups
Fontana Records artists
Mercury Records artists
Columbia Records artists
Chrysalis Records artists